Mame is a musical with the book by Jerome Lawrence and Robert Edwin Lee and music and lyrics by Jerry Herman.  Originally titled My Best Girl, it is based on the 1955 novel Auntie Mame by Patrick Dennis and the 1956 Broadway play by Lawrence and Lee. A period piece set in New York City and spanning the Great Depression and World War II, it focuses on eccentric bohemian Mame Dennis, whose famous motto is "Life is a banquet and most poor sons of bitches are starving to death."  Her fabulous life with her wealthy friends is interrupted when the young son of her late brother arrives to live with her.  They cope with the Depression in a series of adventures.

In 1958, a film titled Auntie Mame, based on the play, was released by Warner Bros. Pictures, starring Rosalind Russell, who created the stage role. Russell was nominated for an Academy Award and won a Golden Globe for her portrayal.

The musical opened on Broadway in 1966, starring Angela Lansbury and Bea Arthur.  The production became a hit and spawned a 1974 film with Lucille Ball in the title role and Arthur reprising her supporting role, as well as a London production, a Broadway revival, and a 40th anniversary revival at the Kennedy Center in 2006.

Background
The musical was inspired by the success of the 1956 Broadway comedy and subsequent 1958 film version starring Rosalind Russell, as well as the 1955 novel by Patrick Dennis.  According to Stephen Citron, in Jerry Herman: Poet of the Showtune, the "kudos [for Auntie Mame] made all involved immediately think of musicalizing the play." Dennis wrote several more comic novels, including a sequel, Around the World with Auntie Mame, and Little Me, which was made into a Broadway musical starring Sid Caesar. The success of that musical may have prompted Lawrence and Lee to turn Mame into a musical. Mary Martin turned down the title role, and after many actresses had been considered, the part went to Angela Lansbury. For its second run, Jerry Herman wanted to cast Judy Garland, but was declined by the producers of the show, who deemed her a liability based on her recent unreliable past experience on another production.

According to Herman it took six months to write the score.

Productions

Original Broadway
The musical opened on Broadway at the Winter Garden Theatre on May 24, 1966. Three years later, it transferred to The Broadway Theatre, where it remained until closing on January 3, 1970.  Between the two venues, it ran a total of 1,508 performances and five previews. The musical was directed by Gene Saks, choreographed by Onna White with scenic design by William and Jean Eckart, costume design by Robert Mackintosh, lighting design by Tharon Musser and orchestrations by Philip J. Lang.  Besides Lansbury as Mame, the cast included Bea Arthur as Vera Charles, Frankie Michaels as Patrick, Jane Connell as Agnes Gooch, Charles Braswell as Beauregard Jackson Pickett Burnside, and Willard Waterman (who had played Claude Upson in the 1958 film) as Dwight Babcock.

Lansbury, Arthur and Michaels all won Tony Awards, while Saks, White, the writers, Herman, and set designers William and Jean Eckart all received nominations.

When Lansbury took a two-week vacation in August 1967 Celeste Holm played the title role, prior to heading the National Tour, and "garnered ecstatic reviews" including from the New York Times.
When Lansbury left the Broadway production on March 30, 1968, to take the show on a limited US tour, Janis Paige was the star chosen to be the new Broadway Mame, starting in April 1968.  Paige's run and the show itself continued to be so successful that she was followed by Jane Morgan (December 1968), who was followed by Ann Miller (May 1969).

National tours

Celeste Holm, who played the role on Broadway for two weeks when Lansbury took a vacation, continued in the role in the first National Tour.  When Lansbury left the Broadway production she led a second limited tour that played in San Francisco starting in April 1968 and also played Los Angeles.

Australia 
The Australian production presented by J. C. Williamson's opened at Her Majesty's Theatre, Melbourne on May 25, 1968, and subsequently played seasons in Adelaide, Perth and Sydney. Gaylea Byrne starred as Mame Dennis, alongside Mary Hardy as Agnes Gooch, Sheila Bradley as Vera Charles and Geoff Hiscock as Beauregard.

West End 
The 1969 West End production starred Ginger Rogers in the title role and Margaret Courtenay as Vera. It ran for a fourteen-month engagement at the Theatre Royal, Drury Lane with a special performance for Queen Elizabeth II. Victor Woolf was the stage manager for this production.

Other productions
Susan Hayward appeared in the Las Vegas production, while such stars as Ann Sothern, Janet Blair, Jane Russell, Elaine Stritch, Edie Adams, Patrice Munsel, Kitty Carlisle, Carol Lawrence, Shani Wallis, Jo Anne Worley, and Sheila Smith have appeared in stock, regional or touring productions.

In 1976, a Mexican production was performed in Mexico City with Silvia Pinal in the title role and Evangelina Elizondo as Vera. In 1985, Pinal reprised the production with the Spanish actress María Rivas as Vera.
In 2014/2015, a Mexican new production was performed in Mexico with Itati Cantoral and Alicia Machado in the title role and Dalilah Polanco as Vera.

Despite the presence of Lansbury, a much-heralded Broadway revival was ultimately unsuccessful. After seven previews, it opened on July 24, 1983, at the George Gershwin Theatre, where it ran for only 41 performances.

Juliet Prowse, who in August 1969 subbed for Ginger Rogers in the original West End production of Mame, would subsequently reprise the title role in a number of U.S. productions, led off by a 1970 Dallas Summer Musicals production whose cast included Jane Connell as Gooch, Ruth Gillette as Mrs. Burnside/ Mrs. Upson, and William LeMassena as Babcock. In the autumn of 1970 Prowse headlined Mame at the Westgate Las Vegas (then known as the International Hotel) in a production featuring reprises by Jane Connell and Ruth Gillette, with Upson being played by Connell's husband Gordon Connell and Vera played by Anne Francine who had replaced Beatrice Arthur in the original Broadway production: by 1983, which year Francine reprised (briefly) the role on Broadway, Francine had played Vera some 800 times. The Westgate production of Mame also featured John McCook as adult Patrick. Prowse resumed headlining Mame in a 1989-1990 North American tour whose cast included Meghan Duffy as Gooch, Thomas Hill as Upson, and Delphi Lawrence as Vera. Subsequent to headlining Mame at Harrah's Lake Tahoe in the summer of 1992, Prowse headlined a production of Mame which played the Alex Theatre (Glendale) and also Spreckels Theater (San Diego) in respectively April and May 1994 with a cast which included Franklin Cover as Babcock and Marsha Kramer as Gooch.

In July-August 1991 Mariette Hartley headlined the St. Louis Municipal Opera Theatre production of Mame whose cast also included Georgia Engel as Gooch, Alan Muraoka as Ito, and Gretchen Wyler as Vera.

In the mid-90's, a concert staging was done for BBC Radio 4. The cast included Julia McKenzie as Mame, Libby Morris as Vera, Claire Moore as Agnes, Bob Sessions as Mr. Babcock, Jon Lee (actor) as Young Patrick, David Kernan as Beauregard, and Robert Meadmore as Older Patrick.

In 1999, The Production Company in Melbourne, Australia staged Mame for their very first season, starring Rhonda Burchmore and Pamela Rabe. In 2008, The Production Company staged Mame once more, in celebration for their tenth anniversary, with Rhonda Burchmore reprising her role.

The Paper Mill Playhouse (Millburn, New Jersey) production of Mame in September and October 1999 was headlined by Christine Ebersole and featured Kelly Bishop as Vera and Paul Iacono as Young Patrick. 

The Kennedy Center production ran from June 1, 2006 to July 2, and starred Christine Baranski as Mame, Harriet Sansom Harris as Vera, and Emily Skinner as Gooch.

Michele Lee headlined a single performance production of Mame at the Hollywood Bowl on 1 August 2004 whose cast also included Allyce Beasley as Gooch, Ben Platt as Young Patrick, Christine Ebersole as Vera, Jennifer Hall as Gloria, Lauri Johnson doubling as Madame Branislowski and Mrs. Burnside, Edie McClurg as Mrs. Upson, Robert Picardo as Babcock, Alan Thicke as Mr. Upson, John Schneider as Beauregard, and Fred Willard as Woolsey. Lee would subsequently headline the Pittsburgh Civic Light Opera production of Mame in July 2008, which featured Donna Lynne Champlin as Gooch.

The first UK production of Mame in fifty years opened at the Hope Mill Theatre (Manchester) in September 2019, with Tracie Bennett headlining a cast which included Tim Flavin as Beauregard, Harriet Thorpe as Vera, and Pippa Winslow doubling as Sally Cato and Mrs. Upson. With Darren Day replacing Flavin, the production encored at the Royal & Derngate Theatre (Northampton) and Salisbury Playhouse in respectively January and May 2020.

Adaptations

A 1974 film version of the musical starred Lucille Ball as Mame, Bea Arthur reprising her role as Vera Charles, Jane Connell reprising her role as Agnes Gooch and Robert Preston as Beauregard. It was both a US box office failure and a critical disappointment with Ball being considered not up to the musical demands of the title role.

Synopsis
The madcap life of eccentric Mame Dennis and her bohemian, intellectual arty clique is disrupted when her deceased brother's 10-year-old son Patrick is entrusted to her care. Rather than bow to convention, Mame introduces the boy to her free-wheeling lifestyle, instilling in him her favorite credo, "Life is a banquet, and most poor sons of bitches are starving to death." Figuring in the storyline are Agnes Gooch (Mame's personal secretary and nanny-in-law), Vera Charles (her "bosom buddy" baritone actress and world's greatest lush) and Dwight Babcock (the stuffy and officious executor of her brother's estate). Mame loses her fortune in the Wall Street Crash of 1929 and tries her hand at a number of jobs with comically disastrous results but perseveres with good humor and an irrepressible sense of style.

Mame then meets and marries Beauregard Jackson Pickett Burnside, a Southern aristocrat with a Georgia plantation called Peckerwood. The trustees of Patrick's father force Mame to send Patrick off to boarding school (the fictional St Boniface, in Massachusetts), and Mame and Beau travel the world on an endless honeymoon that stops when Beau falls to his death while mountain climbing. Mame returns home a wealthy widow to discover that Patrick has become a snob engaged to an equally priggish debutante, Gloria Upson, from a bigoted family. Mame brings Patrick to his senses just in time to introduce him to the woman who will eventually become his wife, Pegeen Ryan. As the story ends, Mame is preparing to take Patrick's young son, Peter, to India with her usual flair.

Principal casts

Musical numbers

Act I
 Overture − Orchestra
 "St. Bridget" − Young Patrick and Agnes
 "It's Today" − Mame, Vera, and Company
 "Open a New Window" − Mame, Young Patrick, and Company
 "The Moon Song" (The Man in the Moon) − Vera, Mame, and Company
 "My Best Girl" − Young Patrick and Mame
 "We Need a Little Christmas" − Mame, Young Patrick, Agnes, Ito, and Beauregard
 "The Fox Hunt" − Uncle Jeff, Young Patrick, Cousin Fan, and Mother Burnside
 "Mame" − Beauregard and Company
 Finale Act I ("My Best Girl" and "Mame") − Young Patrick and Company

Act II
 Entr'acte − Orchestra
 "Opening Act Two" (The Letter) − Young Patrick and Older Patrick
 "My Best Girl (reprise)" − Older Patrick
 "Bosom Buddies" − Mame and Vera
 "Gooch's Song" − Agnes Gooch 
 "That's How Young I Feel" − Mame, Junior, and Company
 "If He Walked Into My Life" − Mame
 "It's Today" (reprise) − Mame and Company
 "My Best Girl" (reprise) − Older Patrick
 Finale Act II ("Open A New Window") − All
 Curtain Calls ("It's Today", "We Need a Little Christmas" and "Mame") − All

Recording
A cast recording of the Broadway production was released on the Columbia Masterworks label in 1966. 
 A CD version, with five bonus tracks, was released by Legacy Recordings in 1999. The bonus tracks include demo versions of "St. Bridget", "It's Today", "Open a New Window", and "Mame", as well as the song "Camouflage" (intended to be sung between Mame Dennis and Vera Charles prior to the discussion of whether Patrick could stay with Mame), all performed by Jerry Herman and Alice Borden. (Another cut song, "Love is only Love", was to be sung by Mame to Patrick before "The Fox Hunt"; it was later used in the movie version of Hello, Dolly!.)

In 1966, Bobby Darin, Louis Armstrong, and Herb Alpert all charted in the United States and Canada with their cover records of the musical's title song. Eydie Gormé had a huge success with her recording of "If He Walked into My Life", for which she received a 1967 Grammy Award for Best Female Vocal Performance. "We Need a Little Christmas" is a well known holiday tune and can be heard in several Disney Christmas parades.

Awards and nominations

Original Broadway production

See also
Auntie Mame, the fictional novel by Patrick Dennis.

References

External links
 
Varietys review of the 2006 production

1966 musicals
Broadway musicals
Mame
Musicals based on novels
Musicals based on plays
Musicals by Jerry Herman
Plays set in New York City
Plays set in the 1920s
Plays set in the 1930s
Plays set in the 1940s
Tony Award-winning musicals
West End musicals